This page is a list of all the matches that Portugal national football team has played between 2000 and 2019.

2000s

2000

2001

2002

2003

2004

2005

2006

2007

2008

2009

2010s

2010

2011

2012

2013

2014

2015

2016

2017

2018

Key: GS, Group stage; R16, round of 16; QF, quarter-finals; SF, semi-finals; 3rd, third-place match; FWC, FIFA World Cup; FWC Q, FIFA World Cup qualification; UEFA NL, UEFA Nations League; FCC, FIFA Confederations Cup

2019

Key: GS, Group stage; R16, round of 16; QF, quarter-finals; SF, semi-finals; 3rd, third-place match; Euro, UEFA European Championship; Euro 2020 Q, UEFA Euro 2020 qualification; UEFA NL, UEFA Nations League

References

External links
Portugal: Fixtures and Results - FIFA.com
Seleção A Jogos e Resultados FPF
Resultados - Zero Zero
Portugal - International Results

2000s in Portugal
2010s in Portugal
Portugal national football team results